Greenfingers or Green fingers may refer to:

Greenfingers, a 2000 British comedy film
 Green Fingers, a 1947 British drama film
 Greenfingers (TV programme), a 1990s Irish television programme

See also 

 Greenfingers Global School
 Green finger sponge
Green Thumb (disambiguation)